Katarzyna "Kasia" Adamik (born 28 December 1972) is a Polish director and storyboard artist. She has directed TV series including 1983, Axis Mundi, and Absentia. Her debut film feature as director, Bark!, was in competition at Sundance Film Festival. Adamik and Olga Chajdas shared the award for Best TV Show at the Polish Film Awards for directing drama The Pack. A Hollywood Reporter article listed her among "four of the country's most prominent directors", naming her alongside the fellow Polish directors she worked on for conspiracy thriller series 1983, which was Netflix's first Polish original series.

Personal life 
Adamik was born in Warsaw, the daughter of Polish film director Agnieszka Holland and Slovak opera director Laco Adamík. Her aunt is film director Magdalena Łazarkiewicz. She graduated in graphics from the Academy of Fine Arts in Brussels.

She came out as a lesbian in 2012.

Career 
Adamik debuted in the film industry in 1993. She has worked as a storyboard artist on an array of movies, including In Darkness, Copying Beethoven, Everything Is Illuminated, Catwoman, Trapped, Julie Walking Home, Angel of Death, Hearts in Atlantis, Angel Eyes, Golden Dreams, Battlefield Earth, Na koniec swiata, The Third Miracle, The Wood, Beloved, Wicked, Polish Wedding, Washington Square, and Total Eclipse. 1983, a Polish-language TV series directed by Adamik and Agnieszka Holland, debuted on Netflix in 2018 as the streaming service's first Polish-language original production.

Filmography

Film

References

External links 
 
 Kasia Adamik at the Culture.pl

1972 births
Living people
LGBT film directors
Polish lesbian artists
Polish film directors
Polish women film directors
Polish storyboard artists
Polish people of Jewish descent
Polish people of Slovak descent
LGBT television directors
Women television directors